Randy Lane (born in 1967) is a former American artistic gymnast, and a current collegiate gymnastics coach. He competed for the Illinois Fighting Illini team from 1986–1989, helping his team to win the 1989 NCAA Championship. Lane is the current head coach of the Long Island University gymnastics team, serving as the program's inaugural head coach after the school added the program in March 2020. 

Lane also serves as the Chair of the Collegiate Gymnastics Growth Initiative (CGGI).

Career

As a gymnast 
Lane competed for the Illinois Fighting Illini team from 1986–1989, with which he won two Big Ten Conference Championship and one NCAA National Championship, in 1989.

Coaching

Championships

NCAA national championships

Conference championships

Competitive history

NCAA

References 

Living people
1967 births
UCLA Bruins women's gymnastics coaches 
American artistic gymnasts
Gay sportsmen
LGBT gymnasts
American LGBT sportspeople